The first USS Chipper (SP-256), later USS SP-256, was a United States Navy patrol vessel in commission from 1917 to 1918.

Chipper was built as a civilian motorboat of the same name in 1913 by the New York Yacht, Launch and Engine Company at Morris Heights in the Bronx, New York. The U.S. Navy leased her on 15 June 1917 from her owner, C. Wetherill of Erika, Virginia, for World War I service as a patrol vessel. She was commissioned about six weeks later, in late July 1917, as USS Chipper (SP-256).

Chipper spent the rest of World War I on section patrol duty along the United States East Coast. She was renamed USS SP-256 in April 1918.

SP-256 was returned to Wetherill on 4 December 1918.

Chipper should not be confused with another patrol vessel and ferryboat, USS Chipper (SP-1049), which also was in commission in the U.S. Navy during World War I.

References
Department of the Navy: Navy History and Heritage Command: Online Library of Selected Images: U.S. Navy Ships: USS Chipper (SP-256), 1917-1918. Later renamed SP-256.
NavSource Online: Section Patrol Craft Photo Archive: SP-256 ex-Chipper (SP 256)

Patrol vessels of the United States Navy
World War I patrol vessels of the United States
Ships built in Morris Heights, Bronx
1913 ships